Banani Ghosh, is a Bengali (Indian) musician,
primary known as an exponent of Rabindra Sangeet, but also specializing
in the music of Atulprasad Sen, Rajanikanta Sen and others.

She was born in Mymensingh in present-day Bangladesh, her father
Prafulla Krishna Ghose was also a musician and poet, and editor of a
children's magazine.  Banani was trained in Hindustani classical music
and at Shantiniketan with the noted Rabindra Sangeet exponent Kanika Banerjee.  Her voice was so similar to her gurus that to some she is known
With a formal degree in music from Rabindra Bharati University, she also
trained with Dilip Kumar Roy of Pondicherry.  Bursting into the
Rabindrasangeet scene in the 1970s, she quickly rose to become an eminent Rabindra Sangeet artist on All India Radio and Doordarshan.

Subsequently, she has lived in Switzerland and in the United States, where
she runs Antara, a Rabindrasangeet organization which has trained
thousands of pupils across the USA over the years.  She has also organized the
Tagore festival Rabindra Mela, which attempts to familiarize the works of
Tagore to an international audience.  She has also staged a number of dance
dramas, Shapmochan (1962), and Bhanushingher Padavali (Rochester, 1983)
being particularly notable.

References

Living people
Rabindra Bharati University alumni
Year of birth missing (living people)
Bengali musicians
Rabindra Sangeet exponents